Divine Love normally refers to Agape

Divine Love may also refer to:
Divine Love (album), by Leo Smith
Divine Love (film), 2019 Brazilian film